The Lady Barron Falls, a tieredcascade waterfall on the Lady Barron Creek, is located in the Central Highlands region of Tasmania, Australia.

Location and features
The waterfall descends over horizontal marine Permian siltstone benches, while the vertical faces of the falls are composed of resistant sandstone layers.

The waterfall is named in honour of Lady Clara Barron, the wife of Sir Harry Barron, a former Governor of Tasmania.

See also

 List of waterfalls of Tasmania
 Lady Barron, Tasmania, a small settlement on Flinders Island

References

External links 

 

Waterfalls of Tasmania
Central Highlands (Tasmania)
Cascade waterfalls
Tiered waterfalls